Encarsia formosa is a species of chalcidoid wasp and a well known parasitoid of greenhouse whitefly, one of the first to be used commercially for biological pest control, from the 1920s. They can use at least 15 species of whitefly as a host, including Bemisia tabaci and Aleyrodes proletella.

The tiny females (about 0.6 mm long) are black with a yellow abdomen and opalescent wings. This species reproduces asexually via thelytoky induced by Wolbachia infection. Males are produced only rarely. They are slightly larger than females and are completely black in coloration.

Life cycle 

Females deposit 50-100 eggs individually inside the bodies of nymphs or pupae of the host species. The wasp larvae develop through four instars in about two weeks at optimum temperatures. Parasitized greenhouse whitefly pupae turn black in about 10 days, while parasitized sweet potato whiteflies turn amber brown. Both are easily distinguished from unparasitized host pupae. Wasp pupation occurs within the whitefly body. Adult wasps emerge about 10 days later.

Use in biological control 

Encarsia formosa has been used as a natural pesticide to control whitefly populations in greenhouses since the 1920s. Use of the insect fell out of fashion due to the increased prevalence of chemical pesticides and was essentially non-existent by the 1940s. Since the 1970s E. formosa has seen something of a revival, with renewed usage in European and Russian greenhouses. In some countries, such as New Zealand, it is the primary biological control agent used to control greenhouse whiteflies, particularly on crops such as tomato, a particularly difficult plant for predators to establish on.

Clap and fling flight 

E. formosa utilizes the clap and fling mechanism often seen in sub-mm insects. The wings, at the apex, and nearly touching, fling apart and generate strong vortices along the leading edge and wing tips. This mechanism works well in low Reynolds number flight as the generated vortices remained attached through the stroke cycle. Flexible wings and bristles along the wing edges help mitigate the large drag forces that the insect must overcome. Unlike normal flight, this method would work in an entirely inviscid medium, as it does not rely on a starting vortex to create circulation about the wing.

References 

Aphelinidae
Biological pest control wasps
Insects used as insect pest control agents
Insects described in 1924
Taxa named by Arthur Burton Gahan